The Madrid—Extremadura high-speed rail line is a rail line under construction, intended to link Madrid and Badajoz. In 2016 the European Union's European Regional Development Fund, gave Spain €205.1m towards the €312.1m needed for the track between Navalmoral de la Mata and Mérida. , the Badajoz–Mérida stretch has begun electrification, and the wider Badajoz–Plasencia stretch is intended to be finished by 2023, with the tentative finishing date for the Plasencia-Navalmoral de la Mata stretch pushed forward to 2025. The Oropesa–Madrid stretch is the least developed part of the project, only in the informative study phase . The local government of Talavera de la Reina have lobbied for the undergrounding of the railway as it would pass through Talavera de la Reina. Once finished by 2030, the Badajoz–Madrid line is expected to provide high-speed rail services linking both cities in 2 hours 31 minutes.

Segments

Badajoz–Plasencia 
Single track from Badajoz to Mérida and double track from Mérida to Plasencia. The infrastructure is built with multi-purpose railway sleepers, set for Iberian gauge but allowing for a future switch to standard gauge.

Plasencia–Talayuela (Oropesa) 
The Oropesa segment of the track will be 68.6 km long.

Oropesa–Madrid 
127 km long, it will consist of a passenger only double track segment between Madrid and Talavera de la Reina and mixed passenger-freight traffic from Talavera de la Reina to Oropesa.

Extension to Portugal 
The extension to Portugal, the Lisbon–Madrid high-speed rail line, forms part of the Trans-European high-speed rail network, which in turn is one of a number of the European Union's Trans-European transport networks (TEN-T). It was defined by the Council Directive 96/48/EC of 23 July 1996.

In 2012 the project was formally cancelled on the Portuguese side of the project as not being financially viable.

But in 2020 the project was brought back by the Portuguese government, who saw the opportunity to invest in the Portuguese railways. The line is currently planned to open by 2030. The current plan is to open the line by sections: firstly Badajoz–Elvas–Évora (and towards the port of Sines), which is currently under construction, and then the line to Lisbon via Poceirão and a new bridge over the Tagus River (as in the original plan). This line could possibly also connect with the new Lisbon–Porto high-speed line and Porto-Vigo high-speed line (both still in planning) if the whole project turns out to be a success.

With a length of 200 km on the Portuguese side, of which 100 km are in service (Intercity trains run at 200 km/h in the upgraded single track), work is underway to close the missing gap between Evora-Badajoz.

References

External links
 Alfa Pendular at CP (Train Operator Company) official page
 Infraestruturas de Portugal (Rail and Road Infrastracture company formed from the merger of REFER and Estradas de Portugal) 
 REFER (Rail Infrastructure company, now a part of Infraestruturas de Portugal)
 RAVE - Rede de Alta Velocidade (Defunct High Speed Infr. Company, merged with REFER)

High-speed railway lines in Spain